On 11 January 2023, an Islamic State suicide bomber killed at least 20 people in Kabul, Afghanistan.

Background
The Islamic State–Taliban conflict began in 2015. IS increased the frequency of their insurgency in 2021, as foreign forces left the country.

Bombing
On 11 January 2023, at least 20 people were killed in a suicide bombing outside the Ministry of Foreign Affairs in Kabul, Afghanistan. Islamic State – Khorasan Province claimed responsibility for the explosion.

See also 
 List of terrorist attacks in Kabul
 List of terrorist incidents in 2023

References 

Building bombings in Afghanistan
2023 murders in Afghanistan
2023 in Kabul
2020s crimes in Kabul
21st-century mass murder in Afghanistan
Attacks on buildings and structures in 2023
Attacks on buildings and structures in Kabul
Suicide bombings in 2023
ISIL terrorist incidents in Afghanistan
Islamic terrorist incidents in 2023
January 2023 crimes in Asia
January 2023 events in Afghanistan
Mass murder in 2023
Terrorist incidents in Afghanistan in 2023